Altiphrynoides is a genus of toads, commonly referred to as Ethiopian toads. They are restricted to highlands of south-central Ethiopia in the Arussi, Bale and Sidamo Provinces. Both species are threatened by habitat loss. They were formerly included in Nectophrynoides, but lack the unusual reproductive mode of those species (they lay eggs, while Nectophrynoides give birth to fully developed young). Conversely, some authorities treat Altiphrynoides as a monotypic genus for A. malcolmi, placing A. osgoodi in another monotypic genus, Spinophrynoides.

Species
There are two species:

References

 
Endemic fauna of Ethiopia
Amphibians of Sub-Saharan Africa
Amphibian genera